Ray Price Sings Heart Songs is a studio album by country music artist Ray Price. It was released in 1957 by Columbia Records (catalog no. CL-1015). AllMusic gave the album four-and-a-half stars. In Billboard magazine's annual poll of country and western disc jockeys, it was ranked No. 1 among the "Favorite C&W Albums" of 1957.

Track listing
Side A
 "I Love You Because" (Leon Payne) - 2:50
 "Let Me Talk to You" (Danny Dill, Don Davis) - 2:30
 "Blues, Stay Away From Me" (Alton Delmore, Henry Glover, Rabon Delmore, Wayne Raney) - 2:25
 "Many Tears Ago" (Jenny Lou Carson) - 3:20
 "Letters Have No Arms" (Arbie Gibson, Ernest Tubb) - 2:55
 "Faded Love" (Billy Jack Wills, Bob Wills, John Wills) - 2:40

Side B
 "Remember Me (I'm the One Who Loves You)" (Stuart Hamblen) - 2:30
 "I Saw My Castles Fall Today" (Ray Price, Rex Griffin)
 "I'll Sail My Ship Alone" (Moon Mullican) - 2:35
 "I Can't Help It" (Hank Williams) - 2:40
 "A Mansion on the Hill" (Fred Rose, Hank Williams) - 2:25
 "Pins and Needles" (Floyd Jenkins) - 2:05

Personnel
Ray Price - vocals
Clifton Howard Vandevender, Grady Martin, Harold Bradley, James Selph, Pete Wade - guitar
Jack Evins, Jimmy Day - steel guitar
Tommy Jackson - fiddle
Bob Moore, Buddy Killen - bass
Floyd Cramer - piano
Buddy Harman - drums

References

1957 debut albums
Ray Price (musician) albums
Columbia Records albums